Jochem Kamphuis (born 11 April 1986) is a Dutch football referee who officiates in the Eredivisie. He has been a FIFA referee since 2020, and is ranked as a UEFA third category referee.

Refereeing career
In 2008, Kamphuis began officiating in the Eerste Divisie. Three years later, he made his refereeing debut in the top-flight Eredivisie. His first match officiated in the league was on 15 October 2011 between SC Heerenveen and De Graafschap. Kamphuis also officiated matches in the Belgian Second Division and the Saudi Professional League. In 2020, he was put on the FIFA referees list. On 18 August 2020, he was named as the video assistant referee for the 2020 UEFA Europa League Final between Sevilla and Inter Milan.

References

External links
 

1986 births
Living people
Sportspeople from Groningen (city)
Dutch football referees